Acrobasis caulivorella is a species of snout moth in the genus Acrobasis. It was described by Herbert H. Neunzig in 1986, and is known from Florida, United States.

The larvae feed on Carya illinoensis.

References

Moths described in 1986
Acrobasis
Moths of North America